Angela Maria Fonseca Spinola is a Portuguese beauty queen who was crowned Miss Portugal 2005. She represented her country to the Miss World 2005 pageant in Sanya, China and Miss Earth 2005 in Quezon City, Philippines, respectively.  Spinola, who grew up in Cape Verde, was a student in Setúbal, Portugal.

External links
http://www.missworld.tv/bio/bio.sps?iBiographyID=51829

Living people
Year of birth missing (living people)
Miss Earth 2005 contestants
Cape Verdean emigrants to Portugal
Portuguese beauty pageant winners
Miss World 2005 delegates